Lokot-lokot or Locot-locot is a delicacy common in Mindanao and the Sulu Archipelago in the Philippines. It is also referred to as jaa in Sulu; tagaktak, tinagtag, tinadtag, or tinagaktak in Maguindanao, and amik in Davao del Sur. Its texture is crunchy, usually colored golden-brown. Lokot-Lokot is usually produced and served on special occasions such as the Muslim feast of Eid al-Fitr.

Lokot-Lokot is made by repeatedly pounding glutinous rice until it becomes fine powder which is then blended with water and other ingredients to create a thick batter. The mixture is then poured into a halved coconut shell with holes called an uluyan directly into frying oil, resulting in fried mats of rice noodles. It is then formed into rolls or folded into a wedge using two wooden spoons called the gagawi.

See also
Daral (food)
Kumukunsi
Panyalam
Shakoy

References

Philippine cuisine
Doughnuts